Meetings, Bloody Meetings is a 1976 British comedy training film that stars John Cleese as a bumbling middle manager. The film was written by John Cleese and Antony Jay, and was produced by Cleese's production company Video Arts. Video Arts released an updated version of the film in 2012 with British comedian Will Smith starring as the central character in charge of a meeting. John Cleese is the judge in the dream sequence in the new version.

Summary of correct meeting method from the film 

 Plan - precise objectives and list subjects
 Inform - everyone must know what, why and goals.
 Prepare - logical sequence of items and time allocation
 Structure and control - evidence, interpretation then action. Stop jumping ahead or cycling back
 Summarize and record - decisions recorded and actions assigned

References

External links 

 

1976 films
1976 comedy films
1970s business films
1970s educational films
British comedy films
Films with screenplays by John Cleese
Films with screenplays by Antony Jay
1970s English-language films
1970s British films
British educational films